Chemical Vapor Deposition was a monthly peer-reviewed scientific journal covering materials science. It was established in 1995 and ceased independent publication in 2015, when it became a section of Advanced Materials Interfaces. The journal was published by Wiley-VCH and the editor-in-chief was Peter Gregory.

Abstracting and indexing
The journal was abstracted and indexed in:

According to the Journal Citation Reports, the journal's final (2016) impact factor was 1.333.

References 

Wiley-VCH academic journals
Materials science journals
Publications established in 1995
Publications disestablished in 2015
Monthly journals
English-language journals